Innovation Centre Denmark helps Danish businesses, startups as well as knowledge and research institutions with access to international knowledge and innovation environments. Innovation Centre Denmark was established and is managed as a partnership between the Ministry of Foreign Affairs of Denmark and the Danish Ministry of Higher Education and Science.

Innovation Centre Denmark is located in seven innovation regions, chosen for their relevance for Danish businesses, researchers, and institutions of higher education: Munich, New Delhi, Seoul, Shanghai, Silicon Valley, Tel Aviv and São Paulo.

History

On June 4, 2006, His Royal Highness, Prince Joachim of Denmark, opened the first Innovation Centre Denmark in Silicon Valley, California. The Centre was a pilot project tasked with creating a sustainable, innovative business model.

A second centre was established in Shanghai in 2007. In 2008, the Innovation Centre Denmark in Munich opened, and the centres in New Delhi, Seoul and São Paulo followed in 2013. Ten years after the first Innovation Centre Denmark was launched, the seventh Innovation Centre was established in 2016 in Tel Aviv.

Organization
Innovation Centre Denmark is a cooperation between the Ministry of Foreign Affairs of Denmark and the Danish Ministry of Higher Education and Science. 

Innovation Centre Denmark is founded on four pillars: 
 Entrepreneurship
 Collaboration in Higher Education
 Partnering and Assessment in Science & Technology
 Business Development

Objectives
The objective of Innovation Centre Denmark is to link companies, investors, research and innovation communities in Denmark and the countries where the Innovation Centers are located. As part of this role, the objective is to facilitate the entry of high potential Danish companies, to attract inbound investment into Denmark and serve as the link between research and innovation environments in Denmark and abroad.

The focus is on innovation and high-growth sectors such as information and communications technology, life sciences, clean technology and sustainable energy solutions, and subfields such as financial technology.

References

External links
 

Government agencies of Denmark
Danish companies established in 2006
Business services companies established in 2006